Caldwell Creek is a stream in Ripley County in the U.S. state of Missouri. It is a tributary of Logan Creek.

Caldwell Creek has the name of the local Caldwell family.

See also
List of rivers of Missouri

References

Rivers of Ripley County, Missouri
Rivers of Missouri